Laurence Kirwan may refer to:

Laurence P. Kirwan (1907–1999), British archaeologist
Laurence A. Kirwan (born 1952), British plastic surgeon